Gaetano "Gay" Talese (born February 7, 1932) is an American writer. As a journalist for The New York Times and Esquire magazine during the 1960s, Talese helped to define contemporary literary journalism and is considered, along with Tom Wolfe, Joan Didion and Hunter S. Thompson, one of the pioneers of New Journalism. Talese's most famous articles are about Joe DiMaggio and Frank Sinatra.

Early life 

Born in Ocean City, New Jersey, the son of Italian immigrant parents, Talese graduated from Ocean City High School in 1949.

Writer origins

High school 
Talese's entry into writing was entirely happenstance, and the unintended consequence of the then high school sophomore's attempt to gain more playing time for the baseball team. The assistant coach had the duty of telephoning in the chronicle of each game to the local newspaper and when he complained he was too busy to do it properly, the head coach gave Talese the duty. As Talese recalls in his 1996 memoir Origins of a Nonfiction Writer:

After only seven sports articles, Talese was given his own column for the weekly Ocean City Sentinel-Ledger. By the time Talese left for college during September 1949, he had written some 311 stories and columns for the Sentinel-Ledger.

Talese credits his mother as the role model he followed in developing the interviewing techniques that would serve him well later in life, interviewing such varied subjects as mafia members and middle-class Americans on their sexual habits. He relates in A Writer's Life:

College 

Talese graduated from the University of Alabama in 1953. His selection of a major was, as he described it, a moot choice. "I chose journalism as my college major because that is what I knew," he recalls, "but I really became a student of history." At university, he became a brother of Phi Sigma Kappa fraternity.

It was here that Talese would begin to employ literary devices more well known for fiction, such as establishing the "scene" with minute details, and beginning articles in medias res (Latin for "into the midst of things"). During his junior year, Talese became the sports editor for the campus newspaper, Crimson-White, and started a column he dubbed "Sports Gay-zing", for which he wrote on November 7, 1951:

This was before Lillian Ross did the same in Picture (1952) or Truman Capote used the technique in The Muses Are Heard (1956). More importantly, Talese included among his subjects both the "losers" and the unnoticed. He was more interested in those who did not attain the glory of winning and less in hero-worshipping the winners.

Professional career

Newspaper reporter 
After graduation in June 1953, Talese relocated to New York City, yet could only find work as a copyboy. The job was, however, at the esteemed New York Times and Talese arrived for his mundane position nevertheless in handstitched Italian suits. Talese was eventually able to get an article published in the Times, albeit unsigned (without credit). In "Times Square Anniversary" (November 2, 1953), Talese interviewed the man, Herbert Kesner, Broadcast Editor, who was responsible for managing the headlines that flash across the famous marquee above Times Square.

Talese followed this with an article in the February 21, 1954 edition, concerning the chairs used on the boardwalk of Atlantic City (something with which he was familiar as his home town of Ocean City is the next hamlet south of the gambling mecca). Yet, his budding journalism career would have to be put on hold – Talese was drafted into the United States Army in 1954.

Talese had been required (as were all male students at the time owing to the Korean War) to join the Reserve Officers' Training Corps (ROTC) and had relocated to New York awaiting his eventual commission as a second lieutenant. Talese was sent to Fort Knox, Kentucky, to train in the Tank Corps. Finding his mechanical skills lacking, Talese was transferred to the Office of Public Information where he once again worked for a local newspaper, Inside the Turret, and soon had his own column, "Fort Knox Confidential".

When Talese completed his military obligation during 1956, he was rehired by the New York Times as a sports reporter. Talese later opined, "Sports is about people who lose and lose and lose. They lose games; then they lose their jobs. It can be very intriguing." Of the various fields, boxing had the most appeal for Talese, largely because it was about individuals engaged in contests and those individuals in the mid to late 1950s were becoming predominately non-white at the prizefight level. He wrote 38 articles about Floyd Patterson alone.

For this, Talese was rewarded with a promotion to the Times' Albany Bureau to cover state politics. It was a short-lived assignment, however, as Talese's exacting habits and meticulous style soon irritated his new editors so much that they recalled him to the city, assigning him to write minor obituaries. Talese puts it, "I was banished to the obituary desk as punishment – to break me. There were major obituaries and minor obituaries. I was sent to write minor obituaries not even seven paragraphs long." After a year working for the Times obituary section, he began to write articles for the Sunday Times, which was then managed as a separate organization from the daily Times by editor Lester Markel.

Magazine reporter 
Talese's first piece for the magazine Esquire – a series of scenes in the city – appeared in a special New York issue during July 1960. When the Times newspaper unions had a work stoppage during December 1962, Talese had plenty of time to watch rehearsals for a production by Broadway director Joshua Logan for an Esquire profile. As Carol Polsgrove indicates in her history of Esquire during the 1960s, it was the kind of reporting he liked to do best: "just being there, observing, waiting for the climactic moment when the mask would drop and true character would reveal itself."

In 1964, Talese published The Bridge: The Building of the Verrazano-Narrows Bridge, a reporter-style, non-fiction depiction of the construction of the Verrazzano-Narrows Bridge in New York City. In 1965, he left The New York Times to write full-time for editor Harold Hayes at Esquire. His 1966 Esquire article on Frank Sinatra, "Frank Sinatra Has a Cold", is one of the most influential American magazine articles of all time, and a pioneering example of New Journalism and creative nonfiction. With what some have called a brilliant structure and pacing, the article focused not just on Sinatra himself, but also on Talese's pursuit of his subject.

Talese's celebrated Esquire essay about Joe DiMaggio, "The Silent Season of a Hero" – in part a meditation on the transient nature of fame – was also published during 1966.

For his part, Talese regarded his 1966 profile of obituarist Alden Whitman, "Mr. Bad News", as his finest.

A number of Talese's Esquire essays were collected into the 1970 book Fame and Obscurity; in its introduction, Talese paid tribute to two writers he admired by citing "an aspiration on my part to somehow bring to reportage the tone that Irwin Shaw and John O'Hara had brought to the short story."

In 1971, Talese published Honor Thy Father, a book about the travails of the Bonanno crime family in the 1960s, especially Salvatore Bonanno and his father Joseph Bonanno. The book was based on seven years of research and interviews. Honor Thy Father was made into a TV movie in 1973.

Talese signed a $1.2 million contract with Doubleday in 1972 to write two books, with the first, Thy Neighbor's Wife, due in 1973. Paperback rights to Thy Neighbor's Wife were sold to Dell Publishing for $750,000 in 1973. He missed Doubleday's initial deadline and spent 8 years researching the book, including managing massage parlors in New York and running a sex shop. In 1979 United Artists paid Talese a record $2.5 million for the film rights. The book was eventually published in 1981 but no film was produced.

During 2008, The Library of America selected Talese's 1970 account of the Charles Manson murders, "Charlie Manson's Home on the Range", for inclusion in its two-century retrospective of American True Crime.

In 2011, Talese won the Norman Mailer Prize for Distinguished Journalism.

Controversies 

In April 2016, Talese spoke at a panel at a Boston University journalism conference. During the panel Talese was asked what nonfiction women writers he found inspiring, to which he responded, "I didn't know any women writers that I loved." In response, a Twitter hashtag was created under #womengaytaleseshouldread.

In June 2016, the credibility of Talese's book The Voyeur's Motel, whose subject was Gerald Foos, was questioned when it came to light Foos had made false statements to Talese which Talese did not verify. When news of the credibility broke, Talese stated, "I'm not going to promote this book. How dare I promote it when its credibility is down the toilet?" In subsequent interviews and on an appearance on Late Night with Seth Meyers, Talese recanted this disavowal, stating that his story was still accurate despite the discrepancies found by the Washington Post.

In a November 2017 interview with Vanity Fair at the New York Public Library's Literary Lions Gala, Talese made comments about the sexual assault accusations against Kevin Spacey that had surfaced over the previous weeks. Talese stated, "I would like to ask [Spacey] how it feels to lose a lifetime of success and hard work all because of 10 minutes of indiscretion 10 years or more ago. I feel so sad, and I hate that actor that ruined this guy's career. So, OK, it happened 10 years ago... Jesus, suck it up once in a while! You know something, all of us in this room at one time or another did something we're ashamed of. The Dalai Lama has done something he's ashamed of. The Dalai Lama should confess... put that in your magazine!" CNN reported the "backlash on social media was almost immediate." Jenavieve Hatch of the Huffington Post called the remarks "disrespectful to survivors of sexual trauma." The Daily Beasts Tom Sykes wrote "chastising an alleged child sexual harassment victim is a terrible look." The Washington Post called his statements a "bizarre, rabid defense of the actor."

 Personal life 
In 1959, Talese married writer Nan Talese (née Ahearn), a New York editor who manages the Nan A. Talese/Doubleday imprint. Their marriage is being documented in a non-fiction book he has been working on since 2007. They have two daughters, Pamela Talese, a painter, and Catherine Talese, a photographer and photo editor.

 In popular culture 
Talese appeared as a character in several strips of the comic Doonesbury, giving an interview to radio host Mark Slackmeyer to promote his book Thy Neighbor's Wife.

 Partial bibliography Books'''
 New York: A Serendipiter's Journey (1961)
 The Bridge: The Building of the Verrazano-Narrows Bridge (1964)
 The Overreachers (1965; compilation of past reportage)
 The Kingdom and the Power (1969)
 Fame and Obscurity (1970; compilation of past reportage)
 Honor Thy Father (1971)
 Thy Neighbor's Wife (1981)
 Unto the Sons (1992; memoir)
 Writing Creative Nonfiction: The Literature of Reality (1995) (textbook; with Barbara Lounsberry)
 The Gay Talese Reader: Portraits and Encounters (2003; contains material from New York: A Serendipiter's Journey, The Overreachers and Fame and Obscurity)
 A Writer's Life (2006; memoir)
 The Silent Season of a Hero: The Sports Writing of Gay Talese (2010; compilation of past reportage)
 The Voyeur's Motel (2016)

 References 

 External links 

 
 
 "Gay Talese", Big Think 
 
 
 "Gay Talese Reads from Thy Neighbor's Wife", Vanity Fair'', April 14, 2009
 "Gay Talese: 'Sinatra Has a Cold'", NPR, September 9, 2003

1932 births
20th-century American journalists
20th-century American male writers
20th-century American memoirists
21st-century American journalists
21st-century American male writers
American essayists
American male non-fiction writers
American writers of Italian descent
Living people
Organized crime memoirists
People from Ocean City, New Jersey
People of Calabrian descent
The New York Times writers
University of Alabama alumni
Writers from Manhattan